Rathor is a village in the Punjab province. It is located at 30°52'30N 74°17'50E with an altitude of 178 metres (587 feet).

References

Villages in Punjab, Pakistan